Casey Christopher Driessen (born December 6, 1978 in Owatonna, Minnesota, United States) is an American bluegrass fiddler and singer.  He plays acoustic and electric five-string violins, each of which has an additional low C string.

He is a graduate of the Berklee College of Music, where he studied with Matt Glaser, and an alumnus of Homewood-Flossmoor High School in Flossmoor, Ill.

He has performed with Béla Fleck, Abigail Washburn, Steve Earle, Tim O'Brien, Darrell Scott, Jim Lauderdale, Lee Ann Womack, Mark Schatz, John Doyle, and Chris Thile. He has recorded with Darol Anger, John Mayer, Jerry Douglas, Jamey Haddad, and Blue Merle.  He has also recorded on the soundtrack for the Johnny Cash film Walk the Line.  He has toured with The Duhks, replacing Tania Elizabeth.

In November 2006 Driessen toured China and Tibet with the Sparrow Quartet (which also includes Béla Fleck, Abigail Washburn, and cellist Ben Sollee).  He also has his own band, the Colorfools, which includes Matt Mangano on bass and Tom "Tommy G" Giampietro on drums.

His first solo recording, 3D, was released in May 2006 on Sugar Hill Records. In 2007, the track Jerusalem Ridge received a Grammy Award nomination for Best Country Instrumental Performance.  With fiddler Darol Anger and Rushad Eggleston, he has released an instructional DVD entitled Chops & Grooves: Rhythmic Explorations for Bowed Instruments.

He contributed to Crooked Still's CD Shaken By A Low Sound (2006), and Taarka's The Martian Picture Soundtrack.  Most recently, he released his second solo recording, "Oog" (2009) on Red Shoes Records.

He has attended the Mark O'Connor fiddle camp as a teacher.

He lives in Valencia, Spain, where he is the director of the Contemporary Performance (Production Concentration) master's degree program at Berklee's campus in Valencia.

References

External links
Casey Driessen official site
Casey Driessen Berklee faculty page 
Sparrow Quartet official site
 Video (Youtube).

1978 births
Living people
People from Owatonna, Minnesota
People from Nashville, Tennessee
American bluegrass fiddlers
Progressive bluegrass musicians
Musicians from Minnesota
Country musicians from Tennessee
Sparrow Quartet members
Homewood-Flossmoor High School alumni